Kim Chung-tae (김충태, born 16 January 1944) is a South Korean gymnast. He competed at the 1964 Summer Olympics and the 1968 Summer Olympics.

References

1944 births
Living people
South Korean male artistic gymnasts
Olympic gymnasts of South Korea
Gymnasts at the 1964 Summer Olympics
Gymnasts at the 1968 Summer Olympics
Gymnasts from Seoul
20th-century South Korean people